The Daley Hills are a group of high, ice-covered hills along the west side of Aviator Glacier between the mouths of Cosmonette Glacier and Shoemaker Glacier, in Victoria Land. The hills were mapped by the United States Geological Survey from surveys and from U.S. Navy air photos, 1960–64, and named by the Advisory Committee on Antarctic Names for Robert C. Daley, U.S. Navy, flight engineer on Hercules aircraft during U.S. Navy Operation Deepfreeze, 1966, 1967 and 1968.

References
 

Hills of Victoria Land
Borchgrevink Coast